Pimplas is a village in Rahata taluka of Ahmednagar district in the Indian state of Maharashtra. It is located close to Rahata.

Population
As per 2011 census, population of village is 3,577, of which 1,830 are males and 1,747 are females.

Economy
Main occupation of village is agriculture and allied work.

Transport

Road
Village is located near Nagar - Manmad highway. It is connected to nearby villages by rural roads.

Rail
Sainagar Shirdi railway station is the nearest railway station to a village.

Air
Shirdi Airport is the nearest airport to a village.

See also
List of villages in Rahata taluka

References 

Villages in Ahmednagar district